WKLV-FM (93.5 FM) is a radio station licensed to serve Butler, Alabama, United States. The station is owned by Educational Media Foundation.

The station is part of the Alert FM digital alert and messaging system for Lauderdale County first responders.

Programming
The station is broadcasting a contemporary Christian music format to the Meridian, Mississippi, area.

History
Butler Broadcasting Corporation received the original construction permit from the Federal Communications Commission (FCC) in 1978 for a new FM station broadcasting with 3,000 watts of effective radiated power on 93.5 MHz. The new station was assigned the call letters WQGL by the FCC. On September 11, 1978, the same day the station applied to the FCC for its license to cover, the owners received new call letters WQGL-FM. WQGL-FM received its license to cover from the FCC on July 30, 1979. On April 8, 1992, the station returned to the unadorned WQGL callsign.

On May 4, 1995, the FCC granted this station a construction permit to move their transmitter site, raise their antenna, and upgrade their broadcast power to 25,000 watts. These upgrades were completed in May 1997 and the station changed call letters to WKZB on June 9, 1997.

In June 2002, Butler Broadcasting Corporation (Darryl Jackson, president) reached an agreement to sell this station to East Mississippi Broadcasters, Inc., a wholly owned subsidiary of Holladay Broadcasting (Bob Holladay, president), for a reported sale price of $771,500. The deal was approved by the FCC on August 16, 2002, and the transaction was consummated on October 30, 2002. At the time of the sale, WKZB broadcast a classic rock music format.

This change would prove short-lived as in early December 2003, Holladay Broadcasting' East Mississippi Broadcasters, Inc., agreed to transfer the broadcast license for this station to Holladay Broadcasting-owned Mississippi Broadcasters LLC. The deal was approved by the FCC on December 10, 2003, and the transaction was consummated on January 1, 2004. Under the new ownership, the station again changed callsigns, this time to WMLV, on July 1, 2005.

In September 2011, WMLV was sold to Educational Media Foundation and went temporarily silent and was to return to the air with EMF's K-Love contemporary Christian format 

On October 4, 2011, WMLV returned to the air with K-Love contemporary Christian. The station changed its call sign to WMLG on July 17, 2015. The station changed its call sign again on June 2, 2017, to WCLR. On November 30, 2018, the station's call sign was changed to WMKQ.

On July 11, 2019, the callsign changed to WKLV-FM.

References

External links

Radio stations established in 1978
Choctaw County, Alabama
Lauderdale County, Mississippi
K-Love radio stations
1978 establishments in Alabama
Educational Media Foundation radio stations
KLV-FM